The President of the City Assembly of Novi Sad is the speaker of the City Assembly of Novi Sad (the second largest city in Serbia and the administrative seat of the Autonomous Province of Vojvodina). The President's term lasts four years, and is elected by members of each new assembly. The current President of the City Assembly of Novi Sad is Jelena Marinković Radomirović (SNS), since 21 August 2020.

The offices of the President of the City Assembly of Novi Sad and the Mayor of Novi Sad were merged and held by the same person until 2004, when they were separated.

Office
According to the current legislation, the City Assembly elects the President and Deputy President of the City Assembly of Novi Sad from the complement of the councilors for the four years’ term.

Authorities (competences)
Organizing the work of the City Assembly;
Summoning sessions, suggesting the agenda and presiding over the City Assembly sessions;
Looking after implementation of the transparency of work of the City Assembly;
Signing bylaws adopted by the City Assembly, and
Performing any other operations entrusted by the City Assembly.

List of presidents

References

See also
List of mayors of Novi Sad

Novi Sad, City Assembly
Politics of Novi Sad
President of the City Assembly of Novi Sad